Edison's Conquest of Mars is an 1898 science fiction novel by American astronomer and writer Garrett P. Serviss. It was written as a sequel to Fighters from Mars, an unauthorized and heavily altered version of H. G. Wells's 1897 story The War of the Worlds. It has a place in the history of science fiction for its early employment of themes and motifs that later became staples of the genre.

The book features Thomas Edison as the primary character, though neither Edison nor H. G. Wells were involved in its creation (although the 2010 edition published by Apogee Books of Canada includes the credit "written in collaboration with Edison"). Set after the devastating Martian attack in the previous story, the novel depicts Edison leading a group of scientists to develop ships and weapons, including a disintegration ray, for the defence of Earth. Edison and company fight the aliens in space and on Mars, eventually causing a flood that defeats the enemy and forces an end to hostilities. Serviss wrote himself into the story as a professor whom Edison consults; also appearing are scientists such as Edward Emerson Barnard, Lord Kelvin, Wilhelm Röntgen, and Silvanus P. Thompson, and heads of state such as Queen Victoria, U.S. President William McKinley, Kaiser Wilhelm II, and Emperor Mutsuhito.

Plot

The book is set following the abortive Martian attack depicted in Fighters from Mars, much more devastating and global than in H. G. Wells' The War of the Worlds, though in both works the onslaught is thwarted when the aliens die from bacterial illness. Determining that the Martians will inevitably return, Earth's leaders, including U.S. President William McKinley, Queen Victoria, Kaiser Wilhelm II, and Emperor Mutsuhito, unite the world against the common threat and plan an attack on Mars. American inventor Thomas Edison leads a group of scientists studying derelict Martian equipment; they are able to develop an anti-gravity device powered by electric repulsion as well as a disintegration ray.

Using this new technology, the allies construct an armada of space ships for the attack. Edison takes some ships to the Moon on a test run; using the first known fictional depiction of space suits. There the explorers uncover evidence of an extinct civilization of giants. The armada heads on, discovering a solid gold asteroid being mined by the Martians. The humans fight two space battles against the Martians, suffering heavy casualties but ultimately winning thanks to the superiority of Edison's ray gun compared to the Martians' electric weapons. The humans take a captive, from whom they learn the Martian language.

The humans reach Mars, but in spite of their superior forces they have lost half their men to the Martians' overwhelming numbers. The Martians envelop the planet in a smoke screen, and the humans retreat to the moon Deimos. During a raid on Mars for supplies, the earth men find Aina, the last of a population of human slaves whose ancestors were captured from Kashmir in a Martian raid 9,000 years before. During this raid, the Martians also constructed the Great Pyramids and the Great Sphynx in Egypt, the latter of which is a statue of their leader. Aina advises Edison that meeting the Martians in battle would be fruitless, and that they should instead attack the dams that channel water from the polar ice. Since most of Mars' cities are under sea level, the flood spreads rapidly, killing most of the Martians and destroying their civilization. Edison and company force a peace with the surviving Martians, and return home to great celebration.

Aliens
There are three type of aliens in the book.

The Martians in this version are not like the squid-like Martians described in H.G. Wells's story. These Martians are more humanoid with arms, legs and an enormous head with projector-like eyes and bad looking faces. However this is only the male, for the species exhibits sexual dimorphism. To Earthlings, they appear unpleasant. The Martian women, however, are graceful and beautiful.

The residents of Ceres are at war with the Martians. However, they are only mentioned, except for a female slave who is 40 feet tall. The 'Cerenites' are this height due to the reduced gravity of their world.

When Edison's men land on the Moon, they discover that the Moon was, at one point, capable of supporting life. Only a giant footprint is seen, leaving the reader (and the characters) wondering what was once there.

Legacy

Serviss' first attempt at fiction, the book was published serially in the New York Journal. Serviss went on to write other science fiction stories, arguably making him the first American to write science fiction professionally. An early example of what would later be called space opera, Edison's Conquest of Mars was also a particularly literal "Edisonade". The book contains some notable "firsts" in science fiction: alien abductions, spacesuits (called "air-tight suits": see Spacesuits in fiction), aliens building the Pyramids, space battles, oxygen pills, asteroid mining and disintegrator rays.

Rocket scientist Robert H. Goddard read both Edison's Conquest of Mars and Fighters from Mars and credited them with helping form his early interest in developing rockets for interplanetary exploration.

Edward Guimont has argued that Edison's Conquest of Mars was an influence on author H. P. Lovecraft's Cthulhu Mythos, particular with its use of the ancient alien tropes of massive alien-built ruins.

See also

Thomas Edison in popular culture

References

Sources

External links

 
 Scans of the 1898 and 1947 editions of Edison's Conquest of Mars
 Review of book at War of the Worlds Invasion
 Edison Conquers Mars
 
 

1898 American novels
Novels about ancient astronauts
Fiction set on Ceres (dwarf planet)
Fiction set on Deimos (moon)
Novels set on the Moon
Novels set on Mars
Novels first published in serial form
American science fiction novels
Cultural depictions of Thomas Edison
War of the Worlds written fiction
Sequel novels
Works originally published in American newspapers
1898 science fiction novels
Space opera novels
Fiction about asteroid mining
Alien invasions in novels